Brandon Alexander King (born 16 December 1994) is a Jamaican cricketer. He was part of the West Indies' squad for the 2014 ICC Under-19 Cricket World Cup. He made his international debut for the West Indies cricket team in November 2019.

Domestic career
King plays for Jamaica in domestic cricket, debuting in first-class cricket in the 2014-15 Regional Four Day Competition, and List A cricket in the 2015-16 Regional Super50. He was selected in the 9th round of the 2017 CPL player draft by the St Kitts & Nevis Patriots. He made his Twenty20 debut for St Kitts & Nevis Patriots in the 2017 Caribbean Premier League on 5 August 2017.

In June 2018, King was named in the Cricket West Indies B Team squad for the inaugural edition of the Global T20 Canada tournament.

King hit 132 not out, the highest innings in CPL history, consisting of 10 fours and 11 sixes in a 72-ball knock against Barbados Tridents at Providence on 6 October 2019 as Guyana Amazon Warriors qualified for the final of the 2019 Caribbean Premier League. In July 2020, he was named in the Guyana Amazon Warriors squad for the 2020 Caribbean Premier League. On 1 September 2020, King scored his 1,000th run in Twenty20 cricket.

International career
In October 2019, King was named in the West Indies' One Day International (ODI) and Twenty20 International (T20I) squads for their series against Afghanistan in India. He made his ODI debut for the West Indies, against Afghanistan, on 11 November 2019. He made his T20I debut for the West Indies, also against Afghanistan, on 14 November 2019.

References

External links
 

1994 births
Living people
Jamaican cricketers
West Indies One Day International cricketers
West Indies Twenty20 International cricketers
St Kitts and Nevis Patriots cricketers
Cricketers from Kingston, Jamaica
Jamaica cricketers